The men's skeleton event at the 2010 Winter Olympics in Vancouver, Canada, took place at the Whistler Sliding Centre on 18–19 February. Canada's Duff Gibson was the defending Olympic champion. Gibson retired after the 2006 Olympics. Switzerland's Gregor Stähli, the defending Olympic bronze medalist was the defending world champion, but did not compete due to a thigh injury sustained during the World Cup event in Lake Placid, New York, on 20 November 2009. The test event held at the venue was won by Jon Montgomery of Canada. The last World Cup event prior to the 2010 Games took place in Igls, Austria (southeast of Innsbruck), on 23 January 2010 and was won by Latvia's Martins Dukurs who also won the overall World Cup title.

Canada's Jon Montgomery took the gold medal, 0.07 seconds ahead of Latvia's Martins Dukurs who had been leading heading into the final run.  Bronze was won by Aleksandr Tretyakov of Russia.

Records
While the IOC does not consider skeleton times eligible for Olympic records, the FIBT does maintain records for both the start and a complete run at each track it competes.

These records were set during the test event for the 2010 Games on 5 February 2009.

Qualifying athletes
On 20 January 2010, the FIBT announced that the following teams had qualified for the 2010 Games: These quotas were updated on 26 January 2010.

These are the athletes who qualified for the men's event as of 1 February 2010.

Results
The first two runs took place on 18 February at 18:30 PST and 19:45 PST. On 19 February, the final two runs took place at 18:20 PST and 19:30 PST.

First run start order was released on the afternoon of 17 February 2010.

TR - Track Record. Top finish in each run is in boldface.

Douglas, who was in seventh place after the second run, was disqualified for not getting his sled into parque fermé, the area where the skeleton sleds are inspected before they go down the Sliding Centre, in a timely manner. Roberts withdrew prior to the start of the third run. Only the top 20 skeleton racers competed in the fourth and final run. Montgomery came from behind to edge Dukurs in the fourth run.

References

Skeleton at the 2010 Winter Olympics
Men's events at the 2010 Winter Olympics